Shake Hands with the Devil is a 2007 Canadian war drama film starring Roy Dupuis as Roméo Dallaire, which premiered at the Toronto International Film Festival in August 2007.  Based on Dallaire's autobiographical book Shake Hands with the Devil: The Failure of Humanity in Rwanda, the film recounts Dallaire's harrowing personal journey during the 1994 Rwandan genocide and how the United Nations didn’t heed Dallaire's urgent pleas for further assistance to halt the massacre.

The film received 12 nominations at the 28th Genie Awards and tied with the film Eastern Promises for most nominations.

Film production and planned release

A co-production of Barna-Alper Productions, of Toronto, and Halifax Film Company, of Nova Scotia, the movie was directed by Roger Spottiswoode (Tomorrow Never Dies, And the Band Played On) and filmed in part on location in Kigali, Rwanda, from mid-June to early August 2006 before returning to Halifax for its "final shoot".

A press conference concerning the film, with Dallaire, Dupuis, Spottiswoode, the producers Laszlo Barna (Barna-Alper) and Michael Donovan (Halifax), as well as Wayne Clarkson of Telefilm Canada, occurred in Montréal on June 2, 2006.

In a special account of the filming published in the Toronto Star on 22 July 2006, David Thompson observes that the actor Roy Dupuis "looks eerily like Dallaire, sporting a carefully groomed moustache, summer tan uniform and authentic blue beret":
Indeed, Dupuis is even wearing Dallaire's original army nametag and decorations from 1994.  Dallaire is collaborating on this project – right down to a line-by-line review of the script – and insisted on giving Dupuis the decorations to add authenticity.  He also gave Dupuis something of himself. "I feel a real connection with this man. He opened up to me", Dupuis says during an interview on the set, the first time he has spoken with media since the gruelling shoot began in Rwanda a month ago.  "I'm here because of him."  ("One Last Dance with the Devil")

In "New Rwanda Genocide Movie Criticizes U.N. Role", first posted on Reuters on August 9, 2006, Arthur Asiimwe quotes from his interview in Kigali with the film's director Roger Spottiswoode:
"Our film is about a man who was aware genocide was coming and tried to get the U.N. to allow him to do something about it, but ... instead it turned him down ...  It is really about the bigger issue of what the U.N. role is in situations like these", he told Reuters at the capital's Amahoro stadium, which sheltered thousands of terrified residents in 1994 as the killers roamed the streets outside.
Spottiswoode said the film was particularly timely given the calls on the United Nations to intervene to end the war in Lebanon, and the ongoing efforts to send a U.N. force to stop rampant murders and rapes in Sudan's troubled Darfur region.  The United States has called the Darfur conflict genocide.

On August 13, 2006, Halifax's The Chronicle Herald issued a call for extras, reporting "After filming several months in Kigali, Rwanda, crews return to Halifax to begin the final shoot ... It will be released in Canada [in September 2007] by Seville Pictures.  Pay channels The Movie Network, Movie Central, and Super Écran have signed on for broadcast rights, along with the CBC and its French-language network Radio-Canada."  According to Marie-Chantal Fiset, in her interview with Jean-Guy Plante published on August 27, 2006, "J'ai serré la main du diable, en version française, devrait sortir en salle en octobre 2007."  (The French version of the film, entitled J'ai serré la main du diable, will open in movie theaters in October 2007.)

Cast

Reception 
The film received mixed reviews from critics. On Rotten Tomatoes it has an approval rating of 55% based on reviews from 11 critics. On Metacritic the film had an average score of 57 out of 100, based on 8 reviews.

Festivals
Shake Hands with the Devil debuted at the 2007 Toronto International Film Festival, with "Visa" public screenings on September 9 and September 11, 2007. The film opened the 27th Atlantic Film Festival, with the NBC Universal Canada Opening Night Gala screening on September 13, 2007.

Accolades
 28th Genie Awards
 Best Motion Picture
 Achievement in Art Direction/Production Design (Lindsey Hermer-Bell, Justin S.B. Craig)
 Achievement in Costume Design (Joyce Schure)
 Achievement in Cinematography (Miroslaw Baszak)
 Achievement in Direction (Roger Spottiswoode)
 Achievement in Music – Original Score (David Hirschfelder)
 Achievement in Music – Original Song ("Kaya" – Valanga Khoza, David Hirschfelder)
 Performance by an Actor in a Leading Role (Roy Dupuis)
 Performance by an Actor in a Supporting Role (Michel Ange Nzojibwami)
 Achievement in Overall Sound (Eric Fitz, Jo Caron, Gavin Fernandes, Benoit Leduc)
 Achievement in Sound Editing (Marcel Pothier, Guy Francoeur, Antoine Morin, Guy Pelletier, Francois Senneville)
 Adapted Screenplay (Michael Donovan)

See also 

 Shake Hands with the Devil (book)
 Roméo Dallaire
 Rwandan genocide
 List of Canadian films
 Hotel Rwanda, a 2004 film dealing with the genocide that centres on the Hôtel des Mille Collines, a location also seen in Sometimes in April
 Shooting Dogs, a 2005 film centred on the École Technique Officielle in Kigali

Notes

References 
 Asiimwe, Arthur.  "Dallaire Movie Criticizes U.N. Role."  Reuters Canada August 10, 2006.  Accessed August 11, 2006.
 ———.  "New Rwanda Genocide Movie Criticizes U.N. Role." Reuters AlertNet: Alerting Humanitarians to Emergencies August 9, 2006, accessed August 10, 2006.
 "Cinéma: Rwanda: Roy Dupuis: Serrera-t-il la main du diable?" ("Cinema: Rwanda: Roy Dupuis: Will He Shake Hands with the Devil?") Radio-Canada May 9, 2006.
 Cooke, Stephen.  "Directing Dallaire: Spottiswoode at Helm of Haunting Tale of Rwandan Tragedy As Seen through Lt.-Gen.’s Eyes."  [Interview with Roger Spottiswoode.]  Halifax Chronicle-Herald August 17, 2006.  Accessed August 17, 2006.
 Coulombe, Michel.  "Roy Dupis est Roméo Dallaire". Radio-Canada September 28, 2007.  Accessed September 30, 2007.
 Demers, Maxime.  "Festival des films du monde: Éprouvant séjour au Rwanda." [Interview with Roy Dupuis.]  Le Journal de Montréal August 27, 2006.  Canoë, Culture-Showbiz Actualités August 27, 2006.  Accessed August 27, 2006.
 "Dupuis Goes from The Rocket to Rwanda." C21 Media May 30, 2006.
 "Dupuis Takes On Dallaire Role." Edmonton Sun June 1, 2006.
 "Dupuis to Play Dallaire in Film Based on Memoir." CTV (Canadian Press) June 2, 2006.  (Updated Fri. June 2, 2006, 5:53 p.m. ET.)
 "Extras Needed for Dallaire Movie in Halifax", Halifax Chronicle-Herald August 13, 2006.  Accessed August 13, 2006.
 Fiset, Marie-Chantal.   "Jean-Guy Plante replonge au coeur du génocide rwandais: Originaire de St-Félix, il a participé au tournage de Shake Hands with the Devil."  [Interview with former soldier and military spokesman for the United Nations who served as the film's consultant on military matters.] Le Citoyen de l'Harricana (Amos, Abitibi, Québec) August 27, 2006.  Les Hebdos Régionaux de Quebecor August 26, 2006.  Accessed August 27, 2006.  (Incl. photo of Plante with Roy Dupuis during shooting.)
 Fraughton, Holly.  "Out of Africa: Filming in Rwanda 'bit of a culture shock' for Director of Photography Bibby." [Interview.] Halifax Chronicle-Herald August 27, 2006. Accessed August 27, 2006.
 Gauthier, Catherine.  "Catherine Gauthier a rencontré le général Dallaire pour la présentation du film": La Doublure du Général on Arts & Spectacles.  Radio-Canada June 2, 2006.  (Video; in French)
 Guy, Chantal.  "Roy Dupuis: quand la belle gueule parle."  ("When Handsome Roy Dupuis Speaks.") La Presse (Canada) June 5, 2006.
 ---.  "Roy Dupuis sera Roméo Dallaire." ("Roy Dupuis Will Be Roméo Dallaire.") La Presse (Canada) May 30, 2006.
 Hays, Matthew.  "From the Rocket to Rwanda." The Globe and Mail June 8, 2006.  ("Insider Edition" subscription required.)
 Heath-Eves, Susannah.  "Rwandan Film Industry Emerging." New Times (Kigali, Rwanda) June 19, 2006.
 Interview with Roy Dupuis and Senator Roméo Dallaire. Tout le monde en parle (Québec version).  Zone Télévision, Radio-Canada.  "Dimanche 30 Septembre", 30 September 2007, 8:00 p.m.  (Hyperlinked program announcement.  In French.)
 Kelly, Brendan.  "Roy Dupuis to Play Roméo Dallaire." Montreal Gazette May 30, 2006, Arts & Life: D5.  (Gazette subscription required.)
 Mercy, Colette.  "Colette Mercy explique ce projet cinématographique" on Arts & Spectacles. Radio-Canada June 2, 2006.  (Audio; in French)
 "Politique étrangère: Harper est irresponsable, selon Roméo Dallaire."  Radio-Canada June 3, 2006.  Incl. links to pertinent audio and video about film and press conference.
 "Roy Dupuis sera la général Roméo Dallaire dans 'J'ai serré la main du diable.'" Canada.com  (Canadian Press) June 2, 2006.
 "'Shake Hands with the Devil' Set to Begin Shooting." The Globe and Mail (Canadian Press) May 30, 2006.  ("Insider Edition" subscription required.)
 Thompson, Allan.  "One Last Dance with the Devil: On Location in Rwanda, As the Cast and Crew of Shake Hands with the Devil Try to Recreate an Unimaginable Horror."  Toronto Star July 22, 2006.
 "Tournage: J'ai serré la main du diable: un "statement politique"."  Radio-Canada June 7, 2006.  Incl. link to dossier on Roméo Dallaire.

External links 
 J’ai serré la main du diable (Shake Hands with the Devil) at Radio-Canada
 
 

2007 films
English-language Canadian films
English-language Rwandan films
2000s war drama films
Quebec films
Canadian Armed Forces in films
Canadian war drama films
Films based on biographies
Rwandan genocide films
War films based on actual events
Films about the United Nations
Roméo Dallaire
Films shot in Nova Scotia
Films directed by Roger Spottiswoode
Films scored by David Hirschfelder
DHX Media films
2007 drama films
French-language Canadian films
2000s Canadian films